The Sukhumi riot was a riot in Sukhumi, Abkhaz Autonomous Soviet Socialist Republic, Georgian Soviet Socialist Republic, Soviet Union, in July 1989, triggered by an increasing inter-ethnic tensions between the Abkhaz and Georgian communities and followed by several days of street fighting and civil unrest in Sukhumi and throughout Abkhazia.

The riots started as an Abkhaz protest against opening of a  branch of Tbilisi State University in Sukhumi, and concluded with looting of the Georgian school which was expected to house the new university on 16 July 1989. The ensuing violence quickly degenerated into a large-scale inter-ethnic confrontation. By the time when the Soviet army managed to temporarily bring the situation under control, the riots resulted in at least 18 dead and 448 injured, mostly Georgians. The first case of inter-ethnic violence in Georgia, it effectively marked the start of the Georgian-Abkhaz conflict.

Background 

From 1921 until 1931 Abkhazia was a quasi-independent Soviet republic, the Socialist Soviet Republic of Abkhazia (SSR Abkhazia), united with the Georgian SSR in a special treaty status but not fully subservient. This arrangement ended when the SSR Abkhazia was downgraded into the Abkhaz ASSR and fully under the control of the Georgian SSR, a move not popular amongst the Abkhaz. Protests were held opposing this move, and repeated again in 1957, 1967, and in 1978. Only in 1978 were there any concessions from either the Georgian or Soviet government, including the upgrading of the Sukhum Pedagogical Institute into a full university, Abkhaz State University.

It was with the onset of perestroika within the Soviet Union that gave renewed hope to the Abkhaz in their desire to leave the Georgian SSR. On 17 June 1988, an 87-page document, known as the 'Abkhazian Letter', was sent to Mikhail Gorbachev and the rest of the Soviet leadership. Signed by 60 leading Abkhazians, it outlined the grievances the Abkhaz felt, and argued that despite the  concessions of 1978, autonomy had largely been ignored in the region. It concluded by asking for Abkhazia to be removed from the Georgian SSR, and it to be restored as a full Soviet republic, akin to the SSR Abkhazia. Though the letter failed to gain the attention of the Soviet authorities, it raised concern amongst the Georgian leadership, who implemented a policy calling for increased instruction of the Georgian language in schools; this faced opposition in Abkhazia, where most ethnic Abkhaz did not speak Georgian but instead used up to three other languages (Abkhaz, Mingrelian, and Russian).

Further issues occurred on 18 March 1989. Around 37,000 people met at the village of Lykhny, a traditional meeting spot for the Abkhaz, and signed what became known as the Lykhny Declaration. It once again called for Abkhazia to become a separate republic like it was between 1921 and 1931. The Declaration, which unlike the prior 'Abkhazian Letter' was made public immediately saw mass opposition demonstrations from the Georgian community in Abkhazia. The protests climaxed in the Georgian capital of Tbilisi and evolved into a major anti-Soviet and pro-independence rally on 9 April 1989, which was violently dispersed by Soviet Interior Ministry troops, resulting in the deaths of at least nineteen, mostly young women, and the injury of hundreds of demonstrators. At a plenum of the Georgian central committee the following day the Communist party first secretary, Jumber Patiashvili, resigned and was replaced by the former head of the Georgian KGB, Givi Gumbaridze. The 9 April tragedy removed the last vestiges of credibility from the Soviet regime in Georgia and pushed many Georgians into radical opposition to the Soviet Union, and exacerbated ethnic tensions between Georgians and other groups, in particular the Abkhaz and Ossetians.

The university controversy 

The issue of a university had always been very sensitive in Abkhazia. Sukhumi State University was established in 1978 as a part of the concessions towards the Abkhaz secessionist demands, which in its turn was triggered by the Georgian national mobilization in defense of their language and culture. The university had three sectors: Abkhaz, Georgian, and Russian. However, Georgian students repeatedly complained of discrimination at the hands of their Abkhaz and Russian lectors and administration. In the aftermath of the 9 April events, Georgian students at Sukhumi State University started a hunger strike, calling for the Georgian sector of the university to be transformed into a branch of Tbilisi State University, and in effect controlled by Georgians and not Abkhaz. Joined by students and faculty from the Subtropical Institute, this was part of a campaign started by ethnic Georgians in Abkhazia for greater cultural separation, and more clear division between the two ethnic groups. Aware it would cause unrest in Abkhazia, the authorities approved the measure on 14 May. In response Abkhaz organized a sit-in. The Supreme Soviet in Moscow also launched a commission, which ruled that the Georgians had no authority to establish the university, as that was solely under its purview. They concluded that a region the size of Abkhazia had no need for two universities. It also found that despite Georgian claims they were discriminated against under the language system in place, they had a higher percent of applications than the Abkhaz sector (33.5% for the Georgian compared to 24% for Abkhaz; the Russian, which would have had applicants from all three groups, saw 42.5% of all applications.

The riots 
Despite the ruling against the legality of the university, entrance exams were scheduled for 15 July. Attempts by Abkhaz to photograph the crowds of Georgians congregated in the city is said to have started the violence. By 7:00pm the university was under attack. Late on 16 July, a crowd of five thousand Abkhaz, many of whom were armed, surged into the building. Several members of the Georgian exam commission were beaten up, and the school was looted.

This set off a chain of events that produced further casualties and destruction as the both sides engaged in armed fighting for several days to come. That evening, Abkhaz and Georgians began mobilizing all over Abkhazia and western Georgia. Svans, an ethnic Georgian subgroup from northeastern Abkhazia, and Abkhaz from the town of Tkvarcheli in Abkhazia clashed in a shootout that lasted all night and intermittently for several days afterward. Meanwhile, up to 25,000 Georgians from western Georgia, and the predominantly Georgian Gali district in southern Abkhazia, gathered near Ochamchire. Soviet Interior Ministry troops were sent in to restore order, and by 17 July the violence had largely dissipated.

Aftermath
The July events in Abkhazia left at least 18 dead and 448 injured, of whom, according to official accounts, 302 were Georgians. It also marked the first case of inter-ethnic violence in Georgia; while previous protests and demonstrations had occurred in Abkhazia, none had seen any casualties. Although a continuous presence of the Interior Ministry troops maintained a precarious peace in the region, outbursts of violence did occur, and the Soviet government made no progress toward solving any of the inter-ethnic problems. The Georgians suspected the attack on their university was intentionally staged by the Abkhaz secessionists in order to provoke a large-scale violence that would prompt Moscow to declare a martial law in the region, thus depriving the government in Tbilisi of any control over the autonomous structures in Abkhazia. At the same time, they accused the Soviet government of manipulating ethnic issues to curb Georgia's otherwise irrepressible independence movement. On the other hand, the Abkhaz claimed that the new university was an instrument in the hands of Georgians to reinforce their cultural dominance in the region, and continued to demand that the investigation of the July events be turned over to Moscow and that no branch of Tbilisi State University be opened in Sukhumi.

Tensions remained high in Abkhazia, and saw the Abkhaz totally disregard Georgian authority in the region. This was confirmed on 25 August 1990, when the Abkhaz Supreme Soviet passed a declaration, "On Abkhazia's State Sovereignty," which gave supremacy to Abkhaz laws over Georgian ones. The same day the Supreme Soviet also declared Abkhazia to be a full union republic within the Soviet Union. This was countered by accusations from Georgians that the Abkhaz were not the original inhabitants of the region, a claim first promoted by Georgian scholars in the 1950s but without any serious academic or historic basis. The victory of a nationalist coalition in October 1990 only further led to increased issues, as the newly-elected Chairman of the Georgian Supreme Soviet, Zviad Gamsakhurdia, was outspoken in his desire to reduce the autonomy of the non-Georgian population in the country. By this point, however, Georgian authority had effectively ceased in Abkhazia: Abkhazia took part in the Soviet referendum on 17 March 1991, which the rest of Georgia boycotted, while the non-Georgian population of region (along with South Ossetia, another autonomous region of Georgia), in turn boycotted the referendum on independence on 9 April 1991.

A power-sharing deal was agreed upon in August 1991, dividing electoral districts by ethnicity, with the 1991 elections held under this format, though it did not last. However with the breakdown of the Gamsakhurida government in Georgia, and efforts by Eduard Shevardnadze to delegitimize Gamsakhurdia by failing to honour agreements he signed, and Abkhaz desires to utilize the ongoing Georgian Civil War, it fell apart. Thus on 23 July 1992, the Abkhaz Supreme Soviet re-instated the 1925 constitution, which had called Abkhazia a sovereign state, albeit one in treaty union with Georgia. Georgia responded militarily on 14 August, starting an offensive. The ensuing war would last until September 1993, and lead to the ongoing Abkhaz–Georgian conflict. In the aftermath of the 1992–1993 war, the Sukhumi branch of Tbilisi State University, which had remained open, was relocated to Tbilisi as the city fell out of Georgian control. It was re-established in Tbilisi in December 1993, and remains there.

Notes

Bibliography

 
 
 
 
 
 
 
 
 
 
 
 
 
 
 
 
 
 
 

Sukhumi
Sukhumi riots
1989 protests
Sukhumi Riots, 1989
Abkhaz–Georgian conflict
July 1989 events in Asia
Protests in Georgia (country)
Protests in the Soviet Union
Riots and civil disorder in the Soviet Union
1989 crimes in Georgia (country)